Dick Axelsson (born 25 April 1987) is a Swedish former professional ice hockey winger. He last played for Djurgårdens IF in the Swedish Hockey League (SHL). He was drafted 62nd overall by the Detroit Red Wings in the 2006 NHL Entry Draft. Axelsson won the Swedish Championship with Färjestads in 2009, and 2011 when he also made the Elitserien All-Star team.

Playing career
He was on loan with Färjestads BK of Elitserien from the Detroit Red Wings, he won the gold medal with the team in 2008–09. The Red Wings drafted him in the second round of the 2006 Draft, 62nd overall.

In 2011, Axelsson left Färjestad to join nearly relegated Modo, where he missed the first few matches due to a wrist injury. In his competitive debut, Axelsson made an assist. After one season with Modo, he then left to join his third Elitserien club, Frölunda HC, in time for the 2012–13 season.

On 31 March 2014, Axelsson opted to leave the SHL and signed a multi-year contract with Swiss club, HC Davos of the National League A (NLA). In his first season in 2014–15, Axelsson contributed to Davos capturing the Swiss championship, posting 33 points in 45 games.

Following three years in Davos, with injury plaguing the 2016–17 season, Axelsson opted to return to Swedish for a second stint with Färjestad BK on an optional two-year deal on 12 April 2017.

Career statistics

Regular season and playoffs

International

Inline hockey

Axelsson found plenty of success on the inline hockey rink as a member of the Swedish national team. Axelsson was a member of five World Champion squads in 2007, 2008, 2009, 2010, and 2012.

In 2008, Axelsson dominated the competition for the duration of the tournament, registering 9 goals and 7 assists in 6 games en route to the gold medal and tournament MVP. The following year, Axelsson continued his dominance on the inline rink, tallying 8 goals and 12 assists in 6 games for the World Champions.

References

External links

1987 births
HC Davos players
Detroit Red Wings draft picks
Djurgårdens IF Hockey players
Färjestad BK players
Frölunda HC players
Huddinge IK players
Grand Rapids Griffins players
Ice hockey players at the 2018 Winter Olympics
Living people
Modo Hockey players
Olympic ice hockey players of Sweden
Ice hockey people from Stockholm
Swedish ice hockey left wingers
Swedish expatriate ice hockey players in the United States
Swedish expatriate sportspeople in Switzerland